In Islam the Zabaniyah (also spelled Zebani) are the tormentors of the sinners in hell. They appear namely in the Quran in verse . Some consider the zabaniya to be the hell's angels' subordinates. As angels, the zabaniyah are, despite their gruesome appearance and actions, ultimately subordinative to God (Allah), and thus their punishment is considered just.

The etymological origin of the term is unclear. Some scholars consider zabaniyah to refer to a class of Arabian demons. Others argue that they designated a group of angels conducting the souls of the dead and throwing the sinners into hell. The idea of punishing angels goes back the Hebrew Bible and are further attested in apocrypha.

Etymology
The word Zabaniyah may have been derived from the syriac shabbāyā. Ephrem used this term for angels who conduct the souls after death. Alternatively, it has been argued the term might have denoted a class of pre-Islamic demons. Al-Khansa is said to have written a poet mentioning zabaniya. Similar to the jinn, they would ride on animals (eagles). Another suggestion attributes the origin to rabbāniyya referring to the lords angelic council. Since none of the older codices of the Quran (Mus'haf) contain variants of this term, it is unlikely it has been changed over time. Another theory holds that this term may derive from Sumerian zi.ba.an.na ("The Scales") and Assyrian zibanitu (also referring to scales). 

Al-Mubarrad suggested, zabāniya could derive from the idea of movement and the Zabaniyah are those who "push somebody [back]". Quran exegete Qatada ibn Di'ama states that the term is used for policemen. Although it is true that the term is sometimes associated with earthly state's agents, this is a post-Quranic development. According to founder of PERSIS, Ahmad Hassan, in his exegesis work Tafsir al-Furqan, he interpret Zabaniyah etymologically as "mighty soldiers of Allah".

As for the number nineteen, independent researcher Gürdal Aksoy suspects it refers to the sum of the seven planets and twelve signs of the zodiac, as found in Mandaen literature, which, while suggestive, is ultimately inconclusive. Scholars such as Richard Bell has found the evidence adduced for this apparent association to lack direct correspondence. In a similar vein, Angelika Neuwirth sees the Qur'an's reference to nineteen as an "ostentatiously enigmatic element", whereas Alan Jones suggests that "initially the meaning of 'nineteen' would have been vague."

In Islamic traditions

Exegetical
Tabari records that ibn Abbas stated that the zabaniya are the punishers in hell. According to Hasan al-Basri, they are God's minions on Judgment Day, driving the sinners into hell with "iron hooks". Mujahid ibn Jabr defended the idea that zabaniya are angels against contrary assertions.

Adam ibn Abd al-aziz describes the zabaniya as angels of death who, according to the Quran (4:97, 32:11), conduct the souls of sinners and question them in the grave. Similar to the angelic pairs Nāzi'āt and Nāshiṭāt and Munkar and Nakir, they are assisting Azrael and seize the souls of the injust. Ghazali states, they appear as black shadows to the dying person, pull their souls out of their bodies, and drag them to hell. According to the hadiths of Muslim ibn al-Hajjaj, the zabaniya were guarding Muhammad while he prayed in the Kaaba. They scared Abu Jahl when he tried to trample on Muhammad's neck with his foot. A similar narration, authorized by ibn Abbas, appears in Sahih Bukhari. Here, Muhammad explains Abu Jahl's retraction that Abu Jahl felt the presence of the zabaniyah. In his Fath al-Bari, Ibn Hajar al-Asqalani explores this event in greater detail, stating that Abu Jahl was asked about his retreat whereupon he answered that he suddenly saw winged terrifying monster in a trench filled with flames, between him and Muhammad. Al-Baladhuri comments on this narration, that the angels which protected Muhammad  were twelve zabaniyah as tall sky. Similarly, Ibn Barrajan (d. 1141) giving commentary on Sura At-Tur that Moses and Aaron are protected by zabaniyah.

Another Hadith narrates that an army of angels of punishment battled against the angels of mercy over the soul of a sinner. In some Turkish lore, it is believed that when both groups battle, their strikes cause thunder. While the angels of mercy are said to be created from light (nur), the angels of punishment are usually said to be created from fire (nar). However, this distinction is not universally accepted among Muslim scholars.

As part of Isma'ili eschatology, Nasir al-Din al-Tusi identified the zabaniya with the seven planets, who administrate the upper barzakhs, indicating that there is a kind of hell within the celestrial spheres. Accordingly, impure souls remain imprisoned within bodies, missing salvation in purely intellectual existence. The Houris appear as counterparts of the zabaniya, who are, in contrast to the zabaniya, items of knowledge from the beyond.

Miraj mythology 
In Mi'raj literature, the zabaniyah are under command of the nineteen angels of punishment. They guard the gates to hell, mentioned in the Quran. Throughout the Mi'raj literature, they are given different names including Suhâil, Tufail, Tarfail, Tuftuil, Samtail, Satfail, Sentatayil, Şemtayil, Tabtayil, Tamtail, Tantail, Sasayil, Tuhayil, Sutail, Bertail, Istahatail. A zabani called Susāʾīl shows Muhammad the punishments of hell. But the zabaniya also fill the landscape of the first layer of hell and the fiery seas wherein. The leader of the hell's angels, Malik, explains to Muhammad that the zabaniyya were created by God inside hell, so they have no desire to leave this place and feel comfortable in it. God would have made them from the fires of hell and placed hardness into their hearts, for they may have no mercy towards the inmates.

Cultural representation 
Islamic art commonly pictures them as horrifying demons with flames leaping from their mouth. Christian Lange noted from the classical exegesis works, that zabaniyah have "repulsive faces, eyes like flashing lightening, teeth white like cows horns, lips hanging down to their feet, and rotten breath". According to the interpretation of Ibn Qutaybah in his work, Uyun al Akhbar, he quoted that Tawus ibn Kaysan has transmitted his description each of the Zabaniya's fingers equal to the number of the sinners that will be thrown into hell after the judgment day.

Origins 
The idea of punishing angels appears in earlier Abrahamic literature. In the Hebrew Bible, God sents punishing angels to smite enemies. (for example, Exodus 12:23) According to the Apocalypse of Paul, an angel casts the sinners into hell. In hell, such angels inflict pain on the inmates with iron hooks. The Book of Enoch mentions punishing angels called satans who act as God's executioners on both sinful humans and fallen angels. The Apocalypse of Peter also mentions angels torturing the sinners in a place of punishment. 

Hubert Grimme raised the possibility that zabaniya originally referred to a class of Arabian demons. In favor of this theory is, that the poetress convert al-Khansa mentions zabaniya in one of her poems as supernatural creatures similar to Sa'aali (a type of jinn). Further, al-Mubarrad associates zabaniya with demons. He states that afarit (a type of underworld demon) were sometimes called "ʿifriyya zibniyya". Rudi Paret argues that the grammar of the term zabani indicates a characteristical action personified in a type of spirit. In that case, the zabani would refer to a spirit pushing someone back.

See also 
 Archon
 Dumah (angel)
 Destroying angel (Bible)
 List of angels in theology
 Kushiel
 Maalik

References

Angels in Islam
Angels of death
Classes of angels
Jahannam
Islamic terminology